Amitabh Varshney is an Indian-born American computer scientist. He is an IEEE fellow, and serves as Dean of the University of Maryland College of Computer, Mathematical, and Natural Sciences. Before being named Dean, Varshney was the director of the University of Maryland Institute for Advanced Computer Studies (UMIACS) from 2010 to 2018.

Education and academic career
Amitabh Varshney attended school at St Gabriel's Academy, Roorkee in Uttarakhand, India. Varshney went on to attend Indian Institute of Technology, Delhi, graduating with a B.Tech in Computer Science & Engineering in 1989. He continued his education at the University of North Carolina, Chapel Hill, earning an M.S. in Computer Science in 1991, and a Ph.D. in Computer Science in 1994. Varshney worked as an assistant professor of Computer Science at Stony Brook University from 1994 to 2000. In 2000, Varshney began working as a professor of Computer Science at the University of Maryland, College Park, where he still works.

Research
Varshney's research pertains to the applications of computer graphics and visualization in engineering, science, and medicine via developments in mesh processing, shading algorithms, perceptual image synthesis, and high-performance visual computing. His findings have been used in a variety of fields including pharmacology, meteorology, plasma physics, nanomanufacturing, medical imaging, and genealogy. Varshney is most renowned for his many studies on level of detail.

Smooth molecular surfaces
In their 1994 report, Varshney, Fred Brooks, and William Wright detail their advances in graphically modeling molecular surfaces:

Dynamic simplification for polygonal models
In 1996, Varshney published an algorithm for real-time simplifications of polygons in a 3-dimensional model:

A continuous level-of-detail representation for an object is first constructed off-line. This representation is then used at run-time to guide the selection of appropriate triangles for display. The list of displayed triangles is updated incrementally from one frame to the next. Our approach is more effective than the current level-of-detail-based rendering approaches for most scientific visualization applications where there are a limited number of highly complex objects that stay relatively close to the viewer.

Optimizing triangle strips
Also in 1996, Varshney published "Optimizing Triangle Strips for Fast Rendering". The study introduced new algorithms for rendering triangle strips in conjuncture with partially triangulated models. Describing their more efficient triangle strip algorithm, Varshney et al. write:

By using triangle strips ... , we can describe the triangulation using the strip ... and assuming the convention that the ith triangle is described by the ith, (i + 1)st, and (i + 2)nd vertices of the sequential strip. Such a sequential strip can reduce the cost to transmit n triangles from 3n to n + 2 verticies.

Simplification envelopes
Varshney proposed the idea of simplification envelopes as a method of simultaneously preserving both global and local topology. A surface's envelope is a shell-like structure consisting of a pair of surfaces a distance ε on either side of the original surface. Each surface has its own level of detail, often referred to as the 'hierarchy of LOD'.
Many consider the main drawback of simplification envelopes to be that the algorithms for their calculation are difficult to program.

Level of detail for 3D graphics
In 2002, Varshney published the first edition of "Level of Detail for 3D Graphics". The book details several principles for optimizing 3D rendering including:
The use of multiple discrete levels of detail (LODs) in lieu of a single view-dependent LOD
Topology-preserving and topology-sensitive simplification algorithms to maximize fidelity
The use of multiple LODs in multiple instantiations in gaming consoles and other constant frame-rate systems
Double buffering, frame locking, and frame-latency manipulation to eliminate tearing and maximize temporal control

The Augmentarium
Varshney serves as director of the Augmentarium Virtual and Augmented Reality Laboratory at the University of Maryland. He oversees research projects developing applications of virtual reality for atmospheric and oceanic sciences, astronomy, stem cell research, fluid dynamics simulations, surgical training, cybersecurity, and data visualization.

Awards
IEEE Fellow
IEEE Technical Achievement Award
IEEE Meritous Service Award
National Science Foundation Career Award

References 

1966 births
Living people
IIT Delhi alumni
University of North Carolina at Chapel Hill alumni
Stony Brook University faculty
University of Maryland, College Park faculty
Fellow Members of the IEEE
Indian emigrants to the United States
American computer scientists
Indian computer scientists